On 7 June 2021, a fire in Pune, Maharashtra, India, killed at least 18 people.

At around 15:45 on 7 June 2021, a fire broke out at a chemical plant on the outskirts of Pune, a city in Maharashtra, India. At the time the fire occurred - 10 miles from the city centre - 37 workers were trapped inside the building.

References

2021 disasters in India
2021 fires in Asia
2020s in Maharashtra
Disasters in Maharashtra
June 2021 fire
Industrial fires and explosions in India
June 2021 events in India
Urban fires in Asia
Events in Pune